Craig Thomson (born 10 March 1995) is a Scottish professional footballer who plays as a midfielder for Forfar Athletic. He has previously played for St Johnstone, Elgin City, Stranraer, East Fife, Brechin City and Airdrieonians.

Career
Thomson played for Kennoway United before joining St Johnstone in 2008, turning professional in 2011. He made his debut for St Johnstone on 19 April 2014, against Dundee United, coming on as a late substitute.

In December 2014, Thomson joined Elgin City on loan, initially until January 2015, then the loan was extended for the rest of the season.

Thomson made his first start for St Johnstone on 16 January 2016, in a 0–0 draw at home to Hamilton Academical. On 25 March 2016, he signed a new contract, keeping him at the club until 2018. Thomson's season ended early through injury in April 2016, when following a match with Dundee United it was revealed that he had suffered a fractured collarbone.

On 11 August 2016, Thomson signed for Stranraer on loan until January 2017. He was released from his contract with St Johnstone by mutual consent on 17 January 2018, signing for Scottish League One side East Fife shortly after.

Thomson moved to Brechin City in January 2019.

On 25 May 2019, Thomson signed for Airdrieonians, remaining with the club until May 2021. 

In June 2021, Thomson joined Scottish League Two side Forfar Athletic on a two-year deal.

Career statistics

References

External links

1995 births
Living people
Scottish footballers
Association football midfielders
St Johnstone F.C. players
Elgin City F.C. players
Stranraer F.C. players
East Fife F.C. players
Brechin City F.C. players
Airdrieonians F.C. players
Scottish Professional Football League players
Forfar Athletic F.C. players